

Events 
January 18 – The first opera performance in the Swedish language, Thetis and Phelée, starring Carl Stenborg, Elisabeth Olin and Hedvig Wigert in Bollhuset in Stockholm, Sweden, marks the establishment of the Royal Swedish Opera.
February – Joseph Leutgeb tours Italy with Leopold and Wolfgang Amadeus Mozart.
May 28 – The opera Alceste by Anton Schweitzer with German language libretto by poet Christoph Martin Wieland is premièred by the Seyler Theatre Company at the Hoftheater Weimar, pioneering a German operatic style.
June 24 - Premiere of the ballet Adele de Ponthieu by Josef Starzer in the Burgtheater in Vienna
July 14 – Wolfgang Amadeus Mozart and his father Leopold go to Vienna in search of work but are unsuccessful and return in September to Salzburg where the family move from Wolfgang's birthplace in Getreidegasse to the Tanzmeisterhaus in Makartplatz.
Composer James Hook vacates his post at Marylebone Gardens in London.

Opera 
Pasquale Anfossi – Demofoonte
Domenico Cimarosa – La finta parigina
Joseph Haydn – L'infedeltà delusa; Philemon und Baucis
Andrea Luchesi – L'Inganno Scoperto, overo Il Conte Caramella (libretto by Carlo Goldoni)
Josef Mysliveček 
Demetrio, ED.10:D15
Romolo ed Ersilia, ED.10:G6
 Giovanni Paisiello – Il tamburo, R.1.37
Anton Schweitzer – Alceste (libretto by Christoph Martin Wieland)

Ballet 
Josef Starzer - Adele de Pontieu

Classical music 
Carl Friedrich Abel – 6 Symphonies, Op. 10
Johann Albrechtsberger – Concerto for Harp in C major
Samuel Arnold – The Prodigal Son (oratorio)
Johann Christian Bach – 3 Symphonies, Op. 9
Jean-Baptiste Canavas – 6 Cello Sonatas, Op. 2
Christian Cannabich – 6 String Trios, Op. 3
Carl Ditters von Dittersdorf – La Liberatrice del Popolo Giudaico nella Persia, o sia l’Esther (oratorio)
Jean-Louis Duport – 6 Cello Sonatas, Op. 3
Ernst Eichner – 6 Symphonies, Op. 7
Felice Giardini – 6 String Trios, Op. 17
Wolfgang Amadeus Mozart
String Quartet No.7 in E-flat major, K.160/159a
Exsultate, jubilate, K.165/158a
Viennese Quartets, String Quartets No. 8-13, K.168–173
Symphony No. 23 in D major, K.181/162b
Symphony No. 24 in B-flat major, K.182/173dA
Symphony No. 25 in G minor, K.183/173dB
 Johann Christoph Oley – Jesus meine Zuversicht
 Gaetano Pugnani – 6 Violin Sonatas, Op. 8
Giovanni Battista Sammartini – Six String Quintets
Joseph Bologne Saint-Georges 
6 String Quartets, Op. 1
2 Violin Concertos, Op. 2
Joseph Schmitt – 6 Symphonies, Op. 6
Carl Stamitz 
6 Quartets, Op. 8
6 Duos, Op. 10

Methods and theory writings 

 Charles Burney – The Present State of Music in Germany, the Netherlands, and United Provinces
 Michel Corrette – Méthodes pour apprendre à jouer de la contre-basse à 3, à 4, et à 5 cordes
 Johann Friedrich Daube – Der musikalische Dilettant
 Johann Adolph Scheibe – Über die musikalische Composition
 Georg Michael Telemann – Unterricht im Generalbaß-Spielen

Births 
January 4 – Johann Peter Heuschkel, composer (died 1853)
March 7 – Tommaso Marchesi, composer (died 1852)
May 6 – Eliodoro Bianchi. Italian tenor (died 1848)
May 26 – Hans Georg Nägeli, composer (died 1836)
July 6 – Wenzel Thomas Matiegka, composer (died 1830)
September 17 – Alexandre de Laborde, librettist and antiquary (died 1842)
September 24 – Johann Philipp Christian Schulz, composer (died 1827)
October 23 – Pietro Generali, composer (died 1832)
December 9 – Marianne Ehrenström, musician and writer (died 1867)
December 24 – Joseph Wölfl, pianist and composer (died 1812)
exact date unknown 
 Edward Bunting, Irish folk song collector
 Inga Åberg, opera singer and actress

Deaths 
April 11 – Carlo Grua, composer (b. c. 1700)
April 12 – Elizabeth Young, operatic contralto and actress (b. c. 1730)
May 24 – Jan Zach, violinist, organist and composer (b. 1699)
July 12 – Johann Joachim Quantz, flautist and composer (b. 1697)
August 25 – Franz Nikolaus Novotny, organist and composer (born 1743)
date unknown
Francis Hutcheson (b. c. 1722)
Joan Baptista Pla, oboist and composer (b. c. 1720)
Hester Santlow, "England's first ballerina" (b. c. 1690)

References

 
18th century in music
Music by year